An Ina Bauer is a "moves in the field" element in figure skating in which a skater skates on two parallel blades. One foot is on a forward edge and the other leg is on a backwards and different parallel edge. The forward leg is bent slightly and the trailing leg is straight. If the leading leg is on the inside edge, the move is known as an inside ina bauer. If the skater is on the outside edge, it is known as an outside ina bauer. Many skaters bend backwards while performing this move, although this is not required. The most flexible skaters can bend over almost completely backwards. When performed this way, the move is called a layback Ina Bauer, after the layback position.

The move is named after Ina Bauer, who invented it.

Technique

The Ina Bauer element is an extended fourth position in ballet in terms of where the feet are placed. However, the front leg is bent and the back leg is kept straight. It can be entered into through an inside-edge spread eagle, and, like the spread eagle, is commonly used as an entrance into jumps, adding to the difficulty level of the jump under Code of Points.  It can be used as an entrance to any jump because the element can be performed on either edge. For example, after the skater exits the Ina Bauer position, a double Axel jump can be executed.

The Ina Bauer can be performed on the inside edge or the outside edge.  The outside edge Ina Bauer is considered more difficult than an inside edge. The back position is not mandatory, although most skaters will at least bend a little. The most flexible skaters can bend their backs until their head is nearly upside down.

Ina Bauer is also a position of the lifting partner in ice dancing lifts. In this case, the lifting partner does not bend backwards.

Gallery

In singles (inside edge)

In singles (outside edge)

In pairs skating

In ice dancing

In synchronized skating

In Japan

Shizuka Arakawa of Japan is famous for her flexible take on the Ina Bauer, during which she bends her back backwards until her head is upside down.  This move was highlighted in Arakawa's winning free skating program at the 2006 Winter Olympics, where she performed an outside edge Ina Bauer, then performed a three jump combination (triple salchow-double toe-double loop). Because of this publicity, the term "ina bauer" has been transliterated phonetically into the Japanese word  and has taken on a new meaning. It is a "vogue" word that has come to mean anything having to do with bending over backwards, because the term was repeated so often that many people mistakenly thought that "ina bauer" referred to the back position, not the skating involved (the back position is more exactly called the layback position, making the move combined with Arakawa's back position a "layback Ina Bauer"). In Japan, it is also known as the "Arakawa way" or the "Arakawa type", after Shizuka Arakawa.

The term has become so popular in Japan that Asahi Breweries has attempted to trademark it. However, that attempt was blocked because it is a proper name and Bauer refused to give the rights.

Also in Japan, in the preview to the fifth episode of the Prince of Stride anime, Ayumu Kadowaki said his sister was Ina Bauer, which would have been impossible since Bauer died in 2014 aged 73, and the story is set in 2017.

References

External links

See Ina Bauer element (MPG)

Figure skating elements